Joseph Anthony Suozzi (August 22, 1921 – October 16, 2016) was an Italian-born American attorney, judge, and politician.

Early life
Suozzi was born in Ruvo del Monte, a village in the province of Potenza, in the Basilicata region. He and his mother, Rosa Ciampa, emigrated to the United States in 1925. They joined his father, Michele, who had preceded them to the U.S., arriving in 1913. Before returning to Italy in 1920 to marry, Michele Suozzi served in the U.S. infantry, and became a naturalized U.S. citizen. As a result, Joseph Suozzi was also a citizen of the United States.

Suozzi attended elementary and high school in Glen Cove and Oyster Bay. He volunteered as an Air Cadet prior to his graduation from college. He entered military service with the United States Air Force during World War II, and became a navigator assigned to a B-24 bombing crew of the 15th Air Force. He was based at Torretta Air Field, in Cerignola, Italy – less than 50 miles from his birthplace. He completed 35 bombing missions in Austria, Yugoslavia, Germany, and Italy, for which he was awarded the Distinguished Flying Cross and the Air Medal with three Clusters.

Career
In 1949, when 28 years old, he was elected to become the third of Glen Cove's city court judges. The New York Times said that he was the youngest elected or appointed judge in the United States. He also served as a justice in New York State's supreme court, as well as in its appellate division.

After attending Harvard Law School, Suozzi was admitted to the practice of law in the State of New York, where he joined with Glen Cove Mayor Luke Mercadante as a law partner, with an office in Glen Cove. The law firm became Mercadante, Suozzi, and Sordi, with the addition of Nicholas A. Sordi, and later Suozzi & Sordi, until Suozzi's election to the supreme court in 1960.

Suozzi was elected to the bench of the City Court of Glen Cove in 1949, and re-elected in 1953. He resigned in September 1955, to become a candidate for mayor of Glen Cove and supervisor of the County of Nassau. He served as mayor from 1956 until 1960. In 1961 he was elected to a fourteen-year term as justice of the Supreme Court of the State of New York. He was re-elected in 1974 for another term, with bipartisan support. In 1976, Governor Hugh Cary appointed him associate justice of the appellate division, second department. In 1980, he left that bench and resumed the general practice of law as a senior partner in the law firm of Meyer, Suozzi, English & Klein, P.C., a Garden City, New York-based law firm.

Personal life
Suozzi and his wife, Marguerite, had five children, including U.S. Rep. Thomas Suozzi, who represents the New York's 3rd congressional district; he was previously mayor of Glen Cove and was Nassau County Executive from 2002 to 2009.

Suozzi died on October 16, 2016, at age 95.

References 

 

1921 births
2016 deaths
20th-century American judges
20th-century American lawyers
20th-century American politicians
Harvard Law School alumni
Italian emigrants to the United States
Mayors of places in New York (state)
Military personnel from New York (state)
New York Supreme Court Justices
People from Glen Cove, New York
People from the Province of Potenza
Recipients of the Distinguished Flying Cross (United States)
United States Army Air Forces personnel of World War II
United States Army Air Forces soldiers
American people of Italian descent